The Rotstöckli (2,901 m) is a peak of the Urner Alps below the Titlis, on the border between the Swiss cantons of Obwalden and Nidwalden. It is Nidwalden's highest point. The summit is split between the municipalities of Engelberg (Obwalden) and Wolfenschiessen (Nidwalden).

References

External links
Rotstöckli on Hikr

Mountains of Switzerland
Mountains of the Alps
Mountains of Nidwalden
Mountains of Obwalden
Highest points of Swiss cantons
Nidwalden–Obwalden border
Two-thousanders of Switzerland